Prince Xi of the Second Rank (僖郡王) was a Qing dynasty princely peerage. The peerage was created in 1682 for Jingxi, Nurhacii's great-grandson and 17th son of Prince An of the Second Rank Yolo. As the peerage was not granted perpetual inheritability, each successive bearer held diminished ranks vis-a-vis his predecessor.

Prince Xi of the Second Rank 

 1682－1717：Grace defender duke Jingxi. Jingxi was granted a title of prince of the second rank with the honourific name "Xi" and demoted to grace defender duke in 1690.

References 

Prince Xi
Extinct Qing dynasty princely peerages